Invocation is a form of supplication or prayer.

Invocation or Invoking may also refer to:

Computing
 Invocation, a method of starting a subroutine
 Implicit invocation, a style of software architecture in which a system is structured around event handling, using a form of callback

Film and television
 "Invocation" (The X-Files), a 2000 episode of the television series The X-Files
 The Invoking, a 2013 American psychological thriller film

Music
 Invocation, a British early music group led by Timothy Roberts
"Invocation", a song by The Carpenters from their 1969 debut album Ticket to Ride

Albums
 Invocation (William Lloyd Webber album), 1998
 Invocation (Sympathy album), 2002
 Invocation (Dew-Scented album), 2010
 Invocations/The Moth and the Flame (Keith Jarrett album), 1980

See also
 Invoke (disambiguation)
 Evocation (disambiguation)